Avnyugsky is a rural locality (a settlement) and the administrative center of Fedkovskoye Rural Settlement of Verkhnetoyemsky District, Arkhangelsk Oblast, Russia. The population was 1,183 as of 2010. There are 16 streets.

Geography 
Avnyugsky is located on the Severnaya Dvina River, 33 km south of Verkhnyaya Toyma (the district's administrative centre) by road. Avnyuga-Posadochnaya is the nearest rural locality.

References 

Rural localities in Verkhnetoyemsky District